Futurism is an artistic and social movement that originated in Italy in the early 20th century.

Futures studies, also known as futurology, is the study of possible futures. Futurists are people specializing or interested in such study.

Futurism or futurist may also refer to:

Cultural movements
 Futurism (painting), a modern art school of painting and sculpture in early 1900s
 Futurism (literature), a modernist avant-garde movement in literature
 Futurist architecture, an architectural movement begun in Italy in 1904
Africanfuturism, an African subculture and literature genre
 Afrofuturism, an African-American and African diaspora subculture
 Cubo-Futurism, the main school of painting and sculpture practiced by the Russian Futurists
 Ego-Futurism, a Russian literary movement of the 1910s
 Indigenous Futurism, a movement consisting of art, literature, comics, games
 Neo-futurism, a contemporary art and architecture movement
 Retrofuturism, a modern art movement
 Russian Futurism, a movement of Russian poets and artists

Religion
 Futurism (Christianity), an interpretation of the Bible in Christian eschatology
 Futurism (Judaism), used in three different contexts: religious, artistic and futures studies

Music
 Futurism (music), a movement in music

Albums
 Musica Futurista, an album of Futurist music
 Futurist (Alec Empire album), 2005
 Futurist (Keeno album), 2016
 The Futurist (Robert Downey Jr. album), 2004
 The Futurist (Shellac album), 1997
 Futurism, an album by Danny Tenaglia

Songs 

 "Futurism", a bonus track from the Muse album Origin of Symmetry
 "Futurism", from the Deerhunter album Why Hasn't Everything Already Disappeared?

Other uses
 Futurism.com, a science and tech website formerly owned by Singularity University
 Futurist (comics), a Marvel Comics character
 Retro Futurism, a Korean play
 Futurist (magazine), published by the World Future Society
 Futurist Theatre, a theatre and cinema in Scarborough, North Yorkshire, England

See also
 The Futurist (disambiguation)
 Future (disambiguation)